The Top Chinese Music Awards is an annual music awards to recognize Chinese popular music artists and works. The Top Chinese Music Awards was established in 2001 and is held in China. The awards have been described by the media as China's equivalent of the Grammys in the United States.

Ceremonies

Categories
2017 Top Chinese Music Awards
 Best Male Singer
 Best Female Singer
 Best All-Round Artist
 Most Influential Award
 Best Film Song
 Best Rock Artist/Group
 Best Ballad Artist/Group
 Best Crossover Idol
 Most Popular Singer-Songwriter
 Most Popular Group
 Most Popular Overseas Artist
 Most Popular Quality Singer
 Most Popular Potential Idol
 Media Recommend Singer-Songwriter
 Media Recommend Internet Idol
 Best New Singer-Songwriter
 Best New Idol

References 

 
2001 establishments in China
Annual events in China
Awards established in 2001
Chinese music awards
Recurring events established in 2001